The Nooran Sisters are  Sultana Nooran (born 14 June 1992) and Jyoti Nooran (born 24 February 1994) who are a devotional Sufi singing duo from Hoshiarpur, Punjab, India. Born to a family of Sufi musicians, they perform Sham Chaurasia gharana classical music. Their public recognition came in 2012 when they were featured with the song "Tung Tung" in MTV Sound Trippin of MTV India, which was adapted as a soundtrack in the 2015 Bollywood film Singh is Bling.

The Nooran sisters released their first album Yaar Gariban Da in 2015. The same year they received their first major awards for the song "Patakha Guddi" in the film Highway including two Mirchi Music Awards "Upcoming Female Vocalist Of The Year" and "Vocalist (Female) Of The Year"), the Global Indian Music Academy Awards and the Screen Awards. They received the Best Playback Singer (Female) award of the Filmfare Awards Punjabi for the song "Yaar Di Gali" in 2017.

Early life and background 
The sisters trained from early childhood under their father, Ustad Gulshan Mir (or  Meer), grandson of Bibi Nooran, a renowned Sufi singer, and son of Swarn Nooran, a Sufi singer of the 1970s. According to Mir, the family was on hard times and Mir gave music lessons to support them. The sisters could not even have formal elementary education.

When Sultana Nooran was seven and Jyoti Nooran was five, Mir discovered their talent while they were playing at home and singing a Bulleh Shah kalam they had heard from their grandmother, "Kulli vichon ni yaar lab lai". Mir asked them if they can sing it with instruments. They sang with perfect beat with music instruments like tabla and harmonium. 

The Nooran sisters had their first television appearance on the Doordarshan Punjabi show Jashan Di Raat in 2005. Jyoti as a solo artist participated in a singing show Nikki Awaz Punjab Di on Punjabi channel MH1 in 2007. In 2010, they were noticed by Iqbal Mahal, music promoter from Canada, who helped them to perform to wider audience. Their performance at the Baba Murad Shah Dargah in Nakodar in 2013 became the first big public appreciation. They performed at the 72nd birthday party of late Ghazal maestro, Jagjit Singh at Harpal Tiwana Center of Performing Arts (HTCPA), and spellbound Patiala, Punjab, India residents with their talent.

Career
The Nooran sisters rose to fame with the talent hunt series in MTV India's MTV Sound Trippin, with their song "Tung Tung" in 2012. They were introduced to the competition by Bollywood music composer-director Sneha Khanwalkar. The song was subsequently used as a soundtrack in Akshay Kumar's 2015 movie Singh is Bling. Later the same year, they performed at MTV Unplugged and Coke Studio @ MTV Season 2 with the song "Allah Hoo", which turned into a YouTube sensation. 

On 2 September 2015, they released their first album Yaar Gariban Da, which contains five tracks and produced by MS Records. In 2017, they received the Best Playback Singer (Female) award of the Filmfare Awards Punjabi for the song "Yaar Di Gali" in the film Channo Kamli Yaar Di. Their song "Baajre Di Raakhi" in the film Krazzy Tabbar earned them a nomination for Best Playback Singer (Female) the Filmfare Awards Punjabi in 2018.

They performed in the Dhaka International Folk Fest in 2016 and 2017. They collaborated with MEMBA and EVAN GIIA for "For Aisha" which was featured in the 2019 film The Sky is Pink, and the 2022 Disney's TV series Ms. Marvel. Jyoti recorded in Tamil films for the composer D. Imman, such as Paayum Puli (2015) and Bogan (2017). She commented: "I didn't even know the language is Tamil. I wrote the lyrics in Hindi. Had to convolute my mouth to sing them."

Bollywood
They got their first break in Bollywood with the song, "Patakha Guddi" in the movie Highway in 2014, with music director A.R Rahman. The song, which they call their favourite, topped Bollywood music charts. It also earned them two of the Mirchi Music Awards in 2015, "Upcoming Female Vocalist Of The Year" and "Vocalist (Female) Of The Year", as well as the Best Music Debut award of the Global Indian Music Academy Awards and the Best Female Playback Singer award of the Screen Awards.

Other movies they have sung in include Sultan, Mirzya, Dangal, Jab Harry met Sejal and Bharat.

Personal life 
Jyoti Nooran married Kunal Passi in 2014. Her parents disapproved of the marriage and filed a court case on underage marriage, as they allegedly claimed Jyoti's matriculation certificate showed her as 16 years of age at the time. After legal proceedings, the family conceded to accept the marriage. Passi acts as the manager of their performances. Sultana is also married and has a son.

Jyoti had performed several times solo. When asked about planning to take up solo career, she answered, "Please don’t recommend it. We complete each other."

Discography

Film songs
All films are in Hindi language unless otherwise noted.

Non-film songs
Yaar Gariban Da (2015)
Sufi Magic from Nooran Sisters (live)
Channo
Meri Maa Best of Durga Mata Jagran Bhents and Bhajans Virendra Singh

Awards and nominations
Gima Awards 2015
 Screen Awards

References

External links

Sufi artists
Indian Sufis
Performers of Sufi music
Indian women folk singers
Indian folk singers
Indian musical duos
Sibling musical duos
Punjabi-language singers
Women musicians from Punjab, India
Singers from Punjab, India
Screen Awards winners
21st-century Indian women singers
21st-century Indian singers
Female musical duos